This article provides details on candidates preselected for the 2007 New South Wales state election which was held on 24 March 2007.

Retiring MPs

Labor
John Bartlett MLA (Port Stephens) – retiring.
Steven Chaytor MLA (Macquarie Fields) – resigned following his (later overturned) conviction for assault of his partner.
Paul Crittenden MLA (Wyong) – retiring.
Bob Debus MLA (Blue Mountains) – retiring.
John Mills MLA (Wallsend) – retiring.
Sandra Nori MLA (Port Jackson) – retiring.
Milton Orkopoulos MLA (Swansea) – forced to resign following his arrest on charges of offences against minors.
John Price MLA (Maitland) – retiring.
Carl Scully MLA (Smithfield) – retiring.
Kim Yeadon MLA (Granville) – retiring.
Meredith Burgmann MLC – retiring.
Jan Burnswoods MLC – retiring.

Liberal
Andrew Humpherson MLA (Davidson) – retiring.
Andrew Tink MLA (Epping) – retiring.
Peta Seaton MLA (Southern Highlands) – retiring.
John Ryan MLC – retiring.

National
Ian Armstrong MLA (Lachlan) – retiring.
Ian Slack-Smith MLA (Barwon) – retiring.

Other
Jon Jenkins MLC (Outdoor Recreation) – resigned some weeks before the election.
David Oldfield MLC (Independent, formerly One Nation) – retiring.
Peter Wong MLC (Unity) – retiring.

Legislative Assembly

Sitting members are shown in bold text. Successful candidates are highlighted in the relevant colour. Where there is possible confusion, an asterisk (*) is also used.

Legislative Council
Sitting members are shown in bold text. Tickets that elected at least one MLC are highlighted in the relevant colour. Successful candidates are identified by an asterisk (*).

See also
 Members of the New South Wales Legislative Assembly, 2003–2007
 Members of the New South Wales Legislative Council, 2003–2007

References
The Daily Telegraph (vote online in our virtual election)
Liberal candidates
Labor candidates (click on "Morris' Team" then "Your Labor candidate")
Greens candidates
Fred Nile's Christian Democrats Party candidates
National Party candidates (click on "State Team")
Democrats candidates
Current NSW MLAs
State Electoral Office – NSW
John Moffat for Cronulla (Australia First)

2007 elections in Australia
2007